Luciano Caruso may refer to:

 Luciano Caruso (composer) (born 1957), Italian jazz composer and saxophonist
 Luciano Caruso (poet) (born 1944), poet, visual artist, critic, journalist and writer